Albert Cornelis (c.1475 – 4 September 1532) was a 16th-century Flemish Renaissance painter. 

Not much is known about Cornelis' life except through his works. He primarily painted religious-themed paintings for church commissions. One work executed by Cornelis The Glorification of the Virgin is part of the Brighton Museum & Art Gallery collection. An altarpiece depicting a similar subject, Coronation of the Virgin, in the Church of St. Jacques, Bruges has also been attributed to him. He died on 4 September 1532 in Bruges.

References
 P. Wescher, 'Some Portraits by Albert Cornelis', The Burlington Magazine 58 (1931), p. 244-251
 D. Tamis, 'The genesis of Albert Cornelis's "Coronation of the Virgin" in Bruges', Burlington Magazine 142 (2000), p. 672-680

1475 births
1532 deaths
Flemish Renaissance painters